St Finbarr's Gaelic Football Club is a Gaelic football club located in the eastern suburbs of Perth, Western Australia.

References

External links

1976 establishments in Australia
Gaelic Athletic Association clubs established in 1976
Gaelic games clubs in Australia
Irish-Australian culture
Sporting clubs in Perth, Western Australia